Hussein Abdul-Wahid  (born 19 January 1993 in Basra, Iraq) is an Iraqi football midfielder. He currently plays for Al-Minaa in Iraq.

International debut
On 4 September 2014, Wahid made his International debut against Peru in a friendly match that ended 0–2 for Peru.

References

External links
 

Iraqi footballers
Iraq international footballers
Sportspeople from Basra
Al-Mina'a SC players
1993 births
Living people
Al-Shorta SC players
Association football midfielders